This is a list of countries by unemployment rate. Methods of calculation and presentation of unemployment rate vary from country to country.
Some countries count insured unemployed only, some count those in receipt of welfare benefit only, some count the disabled and other permanently unemployable people, some countries count those who choose (and are financially able) not to work, supported by their spouses and caring for a family, some count students at college and so on. There may also be differences in the minimum requirements and some consider people employed even if only marginally associated with employment market (for example, working only one hour per week).

There can be differences in the age limit. For example, Eurostat uses 15 to 74 years old when calculating unemployment rate, and the Bureau of Labor Statistics uses anyone 16 years of age or older (in both cases, people who are under education, retired, on maternity/paternity leave, prevented from working due to health, or do not work but have been inactive in seeking employment in the last four weeks are excluded from the workforce, and therefore not counted as unemployed). Unemployment rates are often seasonally adjusted to avoid variations that depend on time of year. Employment rate as a percentage of total population in working age is sometimes used instead of unemployment rate.

For purposes of comparison, harmonized values are published by International Labour Organization (ILO) and by OECD.
The ILO harmonized unemployment rate refers to those who are currently not working but are willing and able to work for pay, currently available to work, and have actively searched for work. The OECD harmonized unemployment rate gives the number of unemployed persons as a percentage of the labour force. Most unemployment rates given in the table below are derived from national statistics and therefore not directly comparable.

List 

* indicates "Unemployment in COUNTRY or TERRITORY" or "Economy of COUNTRY or TERRITORY" links.

OECD

* indicates "Economy of COUNTRY or TERRITORY" links.

References

External links 

Unemployment rate
Unemployment rate